Two Souls in One is the debut album by American saxophonist George Braith recorded in 1963 and released on the Blue Note label.

Reception
The Allmusic review by Stephen Thomas Erlewine awarded the album 3 stars and stated "In some ways, it's hard to view George Braith's playing a soprano and alto saxophone simultaneously as anything other than a gimmick, especially since it's nearly presented that way on his debut album... Nevertheless, Two Souls in One remains an enjoyable, occasionally rewarding, collection of soul-jazz and cautiously adventurous hard bop".

Track listing
 "Mary Ann" (Traditional) - 7:31
 "Home Street" (George Braith) - 6:57
 "Poinciana" (Nat Simon, Buddy Bernier) - 6:17
 "Mary Had a Little Lamb" (Sarah Josepha Hale, John Roulstone) - 6:57
 "Braith-A-Way" (Braith) - 13:29

Personnel
George Braith - soprano saxophone, stritch
Billy Gardner - organ
Grant Green - guitar
Donald Bailey - drums

References

Blue Note Records albums
George Braith albums
1963 albums
Albums produced by Alfred Lion
Albums recorded at Van Gelder Studio